Lander College Old Main Building is a historic academic building located on the campus of Lander University at Greenwood, Greenwood County, South Carolina.  It is a large masonry building, composed of three distinct sections with a blending of elements of the Romanesque Revival and Georgian Revival styles. Two of the sections, Greenwood Hall and Laura Lander Hall, were built in 1903-04; Willson Hall was added in 1911. It is the earliest Lander College building. The tower serves as a focal point for the building and defines its character as a school building.

It was listed on the National Register of Historic Places in 1984.

References

University and college buildings on the National Register of Historic Places in South Carolina
Romanesque Revival architecture in South Carolina
Georgian Revival architecture in South Carolina
Colonial Revival architecture in South Carolina
School buildings completed in 1904
National Register of Historic Places in Greenwood County, South Carolina
Buildings and structures in Greenwood, South Carolina
Lander University
University and college administration buildings in the United States
1904 establishments in South Carolina